Beaver County Courthouse may refer to:

Beaver County Courthouse (Oklahoma), Beaver City, Oklahoma
Beaver County Courthouse (Utah), Beaver, Utah